Donald Ian MacMillan (22 September 1930 – April 1982) was a rugby union player who represented Australia.

MacMillan, a flanker, was born in Toowoomba, Queensland and claimed a total of 2 international rugby caps for Australia.

References

Australian rugby union players
Australia international rugby union players
1930 births
1982 deaths
Rugby union flankers
Rugby union players from Queensland